Finolex Group is an Indian conglomerate company based in Pune, India. The Finolex Group comprises Finolex Cables Ltd., Finolex Industries Ltd., Finolex J-Power Systems Ltd. and Finolex Plasson Industries Ltd. The group was founded in 1958 by P. P. Chhabria and K. P. Chhabria

References

External links
 Official Website

Companies based in Pune
Conglomerate companies established in 1958
Conglomerate companies of India
Indian companies established in 1958
1958 establishments in Bombay State